Molla Kola may refer to:
 Molla Kola, Fereydunkenar
 Molla Kola, Mahmudabad
 Molla Kola, Nowshahr
 Molla Kola, Nur
 Molla Kola, Simorgh